The great shrike-tyrant (Agriornis lividus) is a species of bird in the family Tyrannidae.
It is found in Chile and adjacent areas of south-western Argentina.

Small Description 
It is the largest species of tyrant flycatcher at 27.5–31 cm (10.8-12.2 in) long. The body weight of this large passerine is reported to average 99.2 grams (3.5 oz.) Its natural habitats are subtropical or tropical dry shrubland, subtropical or tropical high-altitude shrubland, and pastureland.

References

great shrike-tyrant
Birds of Chile
great shrike-tyrant
Taxa named by Heinrich von Kittlitz
Taxonomy articles created by Polbot